Bunchy top most commonly refers to:

 Banana bunchy top virus and its concomitant disease.

It is also the short name of several other plant diseases including:

 Papaya Bunchy Top Disease
 Abaca bunchy top virus
 Potato spindle tuber viroid which produces Tomato bunchy top
 Citrus exocortis which produces Indian bunchy top in tomato

Crop diseases